Marcos Vinícius Gomes Nascimento (born 27 June 1991), known as Marcos Vinícus, is a Brazilian footballer who plays for URT as a central defender.

Career
Born in São Paulo, Marcos Vinícius is a product of  Corinthians academy, representing Corinthians U20 in youth competitions.
In 2012, he signed with Palmeiras, who immediately loaned with to Rio Claro in the Campeonato Paulista.

In July 2014, Marcos Vinícius made his first move abroad, joining Primeira Liga club, Vitória de Setúbal, on a two-year deal. He debuted on 17 August 2014, in a match against Rio Ave, but only appeared sporadically throughout his first year. He was released by Setúbal after one year and joined Santo André in December 2015. In January 2017, he joined XV de Piracicaba until the end of the 2017 Campeonato Brasileiro Série D.

References

External links

Marcos Vinícius at ZeroZero

1991 births
Living people
Footballers from São Paulo
Brazilian footballers
Association football defenders
Campeonato Brasileiro Série B players
Sport Club Corinthians Paulista players
Nacional Atlético Clube (SP) players
Sociedade Esportiva Palmeiras players
Rio Claro Futebol Clube players
Esporte Clube Santo André players
Red Bull Brasil players
Esporte Clube XV de Novembro (Piracicaba) players
Associação Portuguesa de Desportos players
Primeira Liga players
Vitória F.C. players
Brazilian expatriate footballers
Brazilian expatriate sportspeople in Portugal
Expatriate footballers in Portugal